Bygland is a municipality in Agder county, Norway. It is located in the traditional district of Setesdal. The administrative centre of the municipality is the village of Bygland. Other villages in the municipality include Åraksbø, Austad, Byglandsfjord, Grendi, Langeid, Lauvdal, Litveit, Longerak, Moi, Ose, Sandnes, Skåmedal, and Tveit. The Norwegian National Road 9 runs through the municipality, following the river Otra where most of the population of Bygland lives.

The  municipality is the 76th largest by area out of the 356 municipalities in Norway. Bygland is the 325th most populous municipality in Norway with a population of 1,134.

General information

The parish of Bygland was established as a municipality on 1 January 1838 (see formannskapsdistrikt law). Since that time, the municipal boundaries have not changed.

Name
The municipality (originally the parish) is named after the old Bygland farm, since the first Bygland Church was built there. The first element is bygg which means "barley" and the last element is land which means "land" or "farm".

Coat of arms
The coat of arms was granted on 15 November 1991. The official blazon is "Vert, a lynx rampant Or". This means the arms have a green field (background) and the charge is a European lynx (Lynx lynx). The lynx has a tincture of Or which means it is commonly colored yellow, but if it is made out of metal, then gold is used. The green color in the field symbolizes the importance of the agriculture and forests in the municipality. The lynx was chosen to symbolize the wild and rich nature in the rural highlands of the municipality.

Churches
The Church of Norway has two parishes within the municipality of Bygland. It is part of the Otredal prosti (deanery) in the Diocese of Agder og Telemark.

Geography
Bygland lies in the middle of the Setesdal valley which is also a traditional district in Aust-Agder county. The valley includes the municipalities of Bykle, Valle, Bygland, Iveland, and Evje og Hornnes. The Otra river flows from the glacially scoured Hardangervidda plateau in the north, through the Setesdal valley (and through Bygland), and into the sea near the city of Kristiansand. The municipality is bordered on the north by Valle, in the east by Fyresdal (Vestfold og Telemark county) and Åmli (Agder county), in the south by Froland and Evje og Hornnes, and in the west by Åseral, Kvinesdal, and Sirdal (all in Agder county).

Bygland is Agder's third largest municipality in area. The municipality stretches from the small town Byglandsfjord in the south to the farms at Langeid in the north. Other lakes include the Åraksfjorden, Gyvatn, Hovatn, Kvifjorden, Longerakvatnet, Straumsfjorden, and Topsæ. The rivers Otra and Topdalsfjorden both run through Bygland on their way south. The Reiårsfossen waterfall is one of many waterfalls in the municipality.

Climate
The precipitation pattern, with autumn and winter as wettest seasons, is in line with an oceanic climate. The all-time high  was recorded in July 1986. The all-time low  is from January 1941. The coldest low after 1980 is  recorded February 1986. The average date for the last overnight freeze (low below ) in spring is 3 May and average date for first freeze in autumn is 14 October giving a frost-free season of 163 days (1981-2010 average).

History

The Setesdal Line was a narrow gauge steam railway which went between Vennesla and Byglandsfjord in Bygland. It was built in 1896. The Setesdal Line's operation was terminated in 1962 and the track was removed between Byglandsfjord and Beihølen.

Other transport up the Setesdal valley was provided by the steamships  and Dølen.

Government
All municipalities in Norway, including Bygland, are responsible for primary education (through 10th grade), outpatient health services, senior citizen services, unemployment and other social services, zoning, economic development, and municipal roads. The municipality is governed by a municipal council of elected representatives, which in turn elect a mayor.  The municipality falls under the Agder District Court and the Agder Court of Appeal.

Municipal council
The municipal council of Bygland is made up of 15 representatives that are elected to four year terms. Currently, the party breakdown is as follows:

Attractions

 Byglandsfjord Station, a former railway station constructed in 1896
 , a wood-fuelled heritage steamboat that travels the route between Byglandsfjord-Bygland and Bygland-Ose on the lake Byglandsfjorden in the summer. 
 Bygland tower, a folk museum.

Notable people 
 Even Torkildsen Lande (1758 in Bygland – 1833) a Norwegian farmer and blacksmith, served on the Norwegian Constitutional Assembly
 Oscar Castberg (1846 in Bygland – 1917) a Norwegian painter and sculptor
 Hallvard Sandnes (1893 in Sandnes - 1968) a Norwegian schoolteacher and writer 
 Olav Bø (1918 in Bygland – 1998) a Norwegian folklorist
 Kjell Kristian Rike (1944 in Byglandsfjord – 2008) a Norwegian sports commentator

References

External links

Municipal fact sheet from Statistics Norway 

Culture in Bygland on the map 
 The Steamboat Bjoren 

 
Setesdal
Municipalities of Agder
1838 establishments in Norway